Kempsey railway station, also known as Pirton railway station, served the village of Kempsey, Worcestershire, England, from 1841 to 1844 on the Birmingham and Gloucester Railway.

History 
The station was opened in November 1841 by the Birmingham and Gloucester Railway. The company also stated that Pirton station was here. It was one of many stations that only appeared in the timetable on 19 May 1842. The station closed on 4 November 1844.

References

External links 

Disused railway stations in Worcestershire
Railway stations in Great Britain opened in 1841
Railway stations in Great Britain closed in 1844
1841 establishments in England
1844 disestablishments in England